Ian MacIntosh Black (born 27 June 1941) is a Scottish former competitive swimmer who represented Great Britain in international competition, including the Olympics and European championships, and Scotland in the Commonwealth Games, during the late 1950s and early 1960s.

Swimming career
Black was BBC Sports Personality of the Year in 1958 at the age of only 17, and is still to date the youngest winner of the award. He earned the BBC honour by winning three gold medals in the 400- and 1500-metre freestyle events, as well as the 200-metre butterfly, at the 1958 European Championships in Budapest, Hungary. In the same year, he also won a gold and two silver medals for Scotland at the 1958 British Empire and Commonwealth Games in Cardiff, Wales; gold in the 220-yard butterfly, silver in the 440-yard freestyle, and silver in the 4×220-yard freestyle relay.

In 1959 he set a new world record in the 400-metre individual medley, 5 minutes 8.8 seconds, a record that would stand for just over a year until broken by swimmer American George Harrison in 1960.

Black qualified to represent Great Britain in three events at the 1960 Summer Olympics in Rome. In the event final of the men's 400-metre freestyle he was placed fourth, posting the same time as Australian John Konrads (4:21.8), but the judges awarded the bronze medal to Konrads. He was also a member of the British teams in the 4x200-metre freestyle relay and 4x100-metre medley relay events, placing fourth and seventh in the finals, respectively.

When competing for Great Britain, he would proudly display his Scottish identity in good humour by wearing a MacGregor tartan dressing gown poolside. As well as excelling in the water, he was also a formidable rugby union player.  In 2002 he became one of the first fifty Scottish men and women inducted into the Scottish Sports Hall of Fame.

He won the 1958 and 1959 ASA National Championship 110 yards freestyle titles, the 1958 and 1959 ASA National Championship 220 yards freestyle titles, the 1958 and 1959 ASA National Championship 440 yards freestyle titles  and the 220 yards butterfly title in 19538 and 1959.

Personal life
Black attended Aberdeen University, where he was awarded a Master of Arts and a Certificate in Education.  In the late 1970s he became head teacher of Seafield Primary School in Elgin.  He taught in Canada and he became headmaster of St Christopher's prep school in Bahrain.  In the early 1980s he was headmaster of Sek Kong Primary School in Hong Kong, before moving to Aberlour House School 1987–89.  He later returned to his former school, Robert Gordon's College in Aberdeen, as headmaster of the Junior School, and retired in 2004.

See also

 List of Commonwealth Games medallists in swimming (men)
 World record progression 400 metres individual medley

References

1941 births
Living people
Sportspeople from Inverness
Alumni of the University of Aberdeen
BBC Sports Personality of the Year winners
Commonwealth Games gold medallists for Scotland
Commonwealth Games silver medallists for Scotland
European Aquatics Championships medalists in swimming
World record setters in swimming
Olympic swimmers of Great Britain
People educated at Robert Gordon's College
Heads of schools in Scotland
Scottish schoolteachers
Scottish male swimmers
Swimmers at the 1958 British Empire and Commonwealth Games
Swimmers at the 1960 Summer Olympics
Commonwealth Games medallists in swimming
Heads of schools in Hong Kong
Heads of schools in Bahrain
Medallists at the 1958 British Empire and Commonwealth Games